Operation Margarethe (Unternehmen Margarethe) was the occupation of Hungary by German Nazi troops during World War II that was ordered by Adolf Hitler.

Course of events
Hungarian Prime Minister Miklós Kállay, who had been in office from 1942, had the knowledge and the approval of Hungarian Regent Miklós Horthy to seek secretly at negotiating a separate peace with the Allies in early 1944. Hitler wanted to prevent the Hungarians from turning against Germany. On 12 March 1944, German troops received orders by Hitler to capture critical Hungarian facilities.

Hitler invited Horthy to the Palace of Klessheim, near of Salzburg, on 15 March. On the evening of 15 March 1944, when Admiral Horthy was watching a performance of the opera Petofi, he received an urgent message from the German minister Dietrich von Jagow, who stated that Horthy had to see him immediately at the German legation. When Horthy arrived, Jagow gave him a letter from Hitler saying Hitler wanted to see him at Schloss Klessheim in Austria on 18 March. As both heads of state conducted their negotiations at Schloss Klessheim, German forces quietly marched from Reichsgaue of the Ostmark into Hungary. The meeting served merely as a ruse to keep Horthy out of the country and to leave the Hungarian Army without orders.

Negotiations between Horthy and Hitler lasted until 18 March, when Horthy boarded a train to return home. On 19 March, the occupation of Hungary began.

When Horthy arrived in Budapest, German soldiers were waiting for him at the station. Horthy was told by Jagow that Hungary could remain sovereign only if he removed Kállay for a government that would co-operate fully with the Germans. Otherwise, Hungary would be subject to an undisguised occupation. Horthy appointed Döme Sztójay as prime minister to appease German concerns.

Being a complete surprise, the occupation was quick and bloodless. The initial German plan was to immobilise the Hungarian army, but with Soviet forces advancing from the north and the east and the prospect of British and American forces invading the Balkans, the German military decided to retain Hungarian forces in the field and so sent troops to defend the passes through the Carpathian Mountains from a possible invasion.

As a consequence of the German occupation, Adolf Eichmann arranged the transportation of 550,000 Hungarian Jews from wartime Hungary (including Jews from territories that had been annexed from Czechoslovakia, Romania and Yugoslavia) to extermination camps with Hungarian authorities' collaboration.

Operation Margarethe II
Operation Margarethe II was the name for a planned invasion of Romania by  German forces in conjunction with those of Hungary if the Romanian government decided to surrender to the Allies and to switch sides. Romania in fact switched sides in August 1944 after a coup d'état, but the operation was never implemented.

See also
 Hungary in World War II
 Operation Panzerfaust
 Chance Survivor

References

Margarethe
Margarethe
Margarethe
Battles and conflicts without fatalities
Germany–Hungary relations